The Wellspring is an American folk rock duo. Formed in 2009, the group is composed of singer-songwriters Dov Rosenblatt and Talia Osteen. Originally from New York City, the group is now based in Los Angeles.

Career
In 2011, the band toured as an opening act for Pete Yorn and Ben Kweller, who delayed Saturday night shows to accommodate Rosenblatt's Jewish faith.

Their debut EP, The Wellspring EP (2011), was produced by Bill Lefler of Goudie, mixed by Greg Collins, and featured instrumentation from Steven Nistor and Dave Eggar. Later that year, they released a holiday EP entitled Keep A Light.

The band's debut album, The Girl Who Cried Sheep, was produced by Eric Rosse and released on January 13, 2014. That same month, the band appeared on the George Jones tribute album Deer Lodge George Jones with a cover of "She Thinks I Still Care". In October, the band released a third EP, Easy Tiger.

Appearances in other media
The band's cover of Big Star's "The Ballad of El Goodo" was featured in the "Charity Case" episode of House.
"Here To Stay" appeared on Cougar Town and Orange Is the New Black.
The band has scored several films, including Coffee Town (2013) and Slow Learners (2015).
The duo served as composers on the 2017 Bravo comedy series The Imposters.

Band members
Dov Rosenblatt - vocals, guitar, piano
Talia Osteen - vocals, bass, piano

Discography
EPs
The Wellspring EP (February 2, 2011; re-released February 14, 2011)
Keep A Light EP (December 23, 2011)
Easy Tiger EP (October 1, 2014)

Albums
The Girl Who Cried Sheep (January 13, 2014)

Singles
"The Ballad of El Goodo" (Big Star cover) (October 10, 2011; non-album single)
"Willing To Lose" (January 15, 2014; The Girl Who Cried Sheep)
"Here We Go (August 29, 2014; Easy Tiger EP)

Compilation appearances
Deer Lodge George Jones (2014) ("She Thinks I Still Care")

References

Folk rock groups from California
Jewish American musicians
Indie pop groups from New York (state)
Musical groups established in 2009
Jewish rock groups